Tony Duvert (July 2, 1945 – August 2008) was a French writer and philosopher. In the 1970s he achieved some renown, winning the Prix Médicis in 1973 for his novel Paysage de Fantaisie. Duvert's writings are notable both for their style and core themes: the celebration and defence of pedophilia, and criticism of modern child-rearing. In the 1970s attitudes to sexual liberation and child sexuality allowed Duvert to express himself publicly.  However, when attitudes altered markedly in the 1980s, he was left feeling frustrated and oppressed.

Youth and early writings
Tony Duvert was born on 2 July 1945 in Villeneuve-le-Roi, Val-de-Marne. As a child, he was shy and withdrawn, but later wrote that his sex life began when he was eight. Expelled from school at twelve for carrying out sexual acts with other boys, he was sent by his parents to a psychiatrist for treatment: the methods used he described as brutal and humiliating. He ran away from home and attempted suicide. In 1961, Duvert joined the high school Jean-Baptiste Corot in Savigny-sur-Orge, where he was a brilliant student, but with few friends. After high school, he moved to Paris to begin an arts degree but preferred to devote himself to writing.

Duvert made his literary debut in 1967 with Récidive, published by Jerome Lindon of Editions de Minuit, who recognised his potential. However the novel's subject matter made the publisher nervous, and the book was printed in a limited edition of 712 copies available only through subscription and selected bookstores.

Highly productive, Duvert soon produced three successive novels: Interdit de séjour and Portrait d'homme-couteau in 1969, and Le Voyageur in 1970, which were also sold by subscription. As well as their political aspect in promoting sexual relations between adults and children, and criticising bourgeois society, these first four novels featured narrative and stylistic experimentation in the form of rambling style, typographic games, the absence or multiplicity of plots, jumbled chronology or facts, and lack of punctuation.

Critical recognition
Thanks to Roland Barthes, Duvert achieved public recognition in 1973 with his novel Paysage de fantaisie (Strange Landscape), which won the Prix Médicis, and was greeted warmly by critics. For Claude Mauriac the book revealed "gifts and art that the word talent is not enough to express".

In 1974, Duvert expounded his ideology at length in Le Bon Sexe Illustré (Good Sex Illustrated) in which he sharply criticised sex education and the modern western family. Critics praised its humor and his ability to observe the pretenses of bourgeois society.

With his literary prize money, Duvert moved to Morocco, an experience which resulted in his next novel Journal D’un Innocent, (Journal of an Innocent) published in 1976. Disillusioned by its society, he moved to Thore la Rochette, before settling in Tours. His next novel Quand Mourut Jonathan (When Jonathan Died), published in 1978, was inspired by an earlier vacation with a neglected boy.

Despite his productivity and critical success, Duvert had not achieved the public success he hoped for. To reach a wider audience and raise awareness of his ideas, he decided to write a novel that would incorporate his favorite themes while being less sexually explicit and written in a classic form. The result was L'Île Atlantique (1979, published in English as Atlantic Island in 2017), which received critical raves, and sold somewhat better than his previous works.

English translations
Good Sex Illustrated, Diary of an Innocent, and Atlantic Island have been published by Semiotext(e)/MIT Press. English translations of Duvert's novels and other books are out of print and difficult to find.

Withdrawal from the world and death
In the 1980s, Duvert published L’enfant au masculin (1980), in which he further expounded his sexual philosophy; a novel Un Anneau d’Argent à l’Oreille; and a book of aphorisms Abécédaire Malveillant: unlike his earlier writings, their critical reception was mostly indifferent or poor.  By the late 1980s, Duvert was unable to pay the rent on his apartment. With the social mood towards pedophilia hardening in the wake of several abuse scandals, he felt the world had turned against him. He withdrew to his mother's house in Loir-et-Cher, and became a total recluse. Duvert published nothing further, and was largely forgotten. However, in 2005, his novel L'Île Atlantique, which had first appeared in 1979, was adapted for television by Gerard Mordillat.

Duvert's body was discovered at his home in August 2008, several weeks after his death, in a state of decomposition. His death briefly raised his media profile in France again; obituaries noted the quality of his writing, but also reflected upon the change in official attitudes to child sexuality.

Gilles Sebhan has published two French-language biographical works on Duvert, Tony Duvert: L'Enfant Silencieux (Éditions Denoël 2010) and Retour à Duvert (le dilettante 2015). To date, neither book has been translated into English.

Bibliography

Novels
Récidive, Éditions de Minuit, Paris, 1967
Interdit de séjour, Éditions de Minuit, Paris, 1969
Portrait d’homme-couteau, Éditions de Minuit, Paris, 1969
Le voyageur, Éditions de Minuit, Paris, 1970
Paysage de fantaisie, Éditions de Minuit, Paris, 1973; trans. Strange Landscape Random House 1976
Journal d’un innocent, Éditions de Minuit, Paris, 1976; trans. Diary of An Innocent Semiotext(e) 2010
Quand mourut Jonathan, Éditions de Minuit, Paris, 1978; trans. When Jonathan Died Gay Mens Press 1991
L'Île Atlantique, Éditions de Minuit, Paris, 1979; trans Atlantic Island Semiotext(e) 2017
Un anneau d'argent à l’oreille, Éditions de Minuit, Paris, 1982

Essays
« La parole et la fiction : à propos du Libera », dans Critique n°252, mai 1968. Réédition Éditions de Minuit, 1984
« La lecture introuvable », in Minuit n° 1, Éditions de Minuit, November 1972
« La sexualité chez les crétins », in Minuit n°3, Éditions de Minuit, March 1973, p. 60-72
« La folie Tristan, ou, L’indésirable », in Minuit n°4, Éditions de Minuit, May 1973, p. 53-70
Le bon sexe illustré, Éditions de Minuit, Paris, 1974 trans.  Good Sex Illustrated Semiotext(e) 2007
« L'érotisme des autres », in Minuit n°19, Éditions de Minuit, May 1976, p. 2-12
L'enfant au masculin, Éditions de Minuit, Paris, 1980
« Genet contre Bataille », in Masques n°12, Winter 1981-1982
Abécédaire malveillant, Éditions de Minuit, Paris, 1989

Prose Poetry
« Ballade des petits métiers », in Minuit n° 24, Éditions de Minuit, April 1977
District, Fata Morgana, Montpellier, 1978; trans. District Wakefield Press, 2017
« Le garçon à la tête dure : inspiré des Mille et une Nuits », in Minuit n° 30, Éditions de Minuit, September 1978Les petits métiers, Fata Morgana, Montpellier, 1978; trans. Odd Jobs Wakefield Press, 2017
« Conte », in Libération Sandwich n° 4, 22 December 1979

Interviews
« Tony Duvert – Non à l'enfant poupée », interview by Guy Hocquenghem and Marc Voline, in Libération'', 10 and 11 April 1979.

References

1945 births
2008 deaths
People from Villeneuve-le-Roi
20th-century French novelists
21st-century French novelists
Writers from Île-de-France
Pedophile advocacy
French LGBT novelists
French male novelists
20th-century French male writers
21st-century French male writers
French male non-fiction writers
20th-century French philosophers
Prix Médicis winners
20th-century French LGBT people
21st-century French LGBT people